Riverton Historic District may refer to:

 Riverton Historic District (Riverton, Connecticut), listed on the NRHP in Connecticut
 Riverton Historic District (Riverton, New Jersey), listed on the NRHP in New Jersey
 Riverton Historic District (Riverton, Utah), listed on the NRHP in Utah
 Riverton Historic District (Front Royal, Virginia), listed on the NRHP in Virginia